The Valkiri is a South African self-propelled multiple rocket launcher. It is a 127mm system with a wheeled launcher vehicle, and fire control equipment developed by Armscor. Contemporary models consist of a single launch module with five eight-cell rocket pods on a Unimog or SAMIL-100 carrier. Its mission is to engage in counter-battery strikes against hostile artillery and air defences as far as 36 km (22 mi) away. Other potential warheads include cluster and an anti-tank mine dispenser.

The system is inspired by the Soviet BM-21 Grad, which was deployed against South African expeditionary forces in Angola during Operation Savannah. Development was completed in 1971.  Valkiris played a key role in Operation Alpha Centauri and Operation Moduler during the late 1980s.

Variants 
 Valkiri-22 Mk 1 (original version): 24 launch tubes mounted on a Unimog light 4x4 truck.

 Bateleur (current version): 40 launch tubes mounted on an armoured Samil 100 6x6 truck.

  a shortened lighter trailer-mounted version for airborne use. It has 12 launch tubes and uses a shortened version of the 127 mm rocket that has a maximum range of 5500 metres.

Operators 
  /  South African National Defence Force: 76 in reserve.

References

External links

 Army Recognition.com
 Photos at decade SA Bush War—halfway down the page

Wheeled self-propelled rocket launchers
Rocket artillery
Cold War artillery of South Africa
Field artillery of the Cold War
127 mm artillery
Multiple rocket launchers